Sarwar Jamal Nizam is a Bangladesh Nationalist Party politician and the former Member of Parliament from Chittagong-12.

Career
Nizam was elected to parliament from Chittagong-12 as a Bangladesh Nationalist Party candidate. He is the brother of former Bangladesh Navy Chief Vice Admiral Sarwar Jahan Nizam.

Nizam was arrested in June 2007 by members of Rapid Action Battalion over the death of Jamaluddin Chowdhury, a businessman and Bangladesh Nationalist Party politician based in Chittagong. On 24 July 2003, Jamaluddin Chowdhury was abducted from Chittagong. The kidnappers demanded 10 million taka in ransom. His remains were discovered on 24 July 2003. Nizams younger brother, Maruf Nizam, was accused of being involved with the murder by the victims family members.

References

Bangladesh Nationalist Party politicians
Living people
8th Jatiya Sangsad members
Year of birth missing (living people)
6th Jatiya Sangsad members
7th Jatiya Sangsad members
People from Chittagong District